Sweden held its European Parliament election on 26 May 2019 in the same week as 27 other countries to fill Sweden's 20 seats in the parliament.

Results

By European parliamentary group

Results by county
The Swedish results are counted by county only, since the seats are shared on a national basis, rendering eight fewer counting areas than in Riksdag elections.

Percentage share

By votes

Municipal results

Blekinge

Dalarna

Gotland

Gävleborg

Halland

Jämtland

Jönköping

Kalmar

Kronoberg

Norrbotten

Skåne

Stockholm

Södermanland

Uppsala

Värmland

Västerbotten

Västernorrland

Västmanland

Västra Götaland

Örebro

Östergötland

References

2019 results
2019 elections in Sweden